The 2014 Speedway European Championship finals take place from 6 July to 19 September 2014.

Round 1 
 6 July 2014
  Güstrow
 Speedway Stadion Güstrow (Length: 298m)
 References

Round 2 
 20 July 2014
  Tolyatti
 Mega-Lada Stadium (Length: 353m)

Round 3 
 9 August 2014
  Holsted
 Moldow Arena (Length: 300m)

Round 4 
 19 September 2014
  Częstochowa
 Częstochowa Arena (Length: 368m)

See also 
 Motorcycle Speedway
 2014 Speedway European Championship

References 

Speedway European Championship
European Championship qualification